The 2012 Pan American Handball Championship, also called PanAmericano 2012, was the 15th official competition for senior men's national handball teams of North, Center, Caribbean and South America. It was held from 18 to 24 June 2012 in Burzaco, Almirante Brown Partido, Argentina. It also acted as the qualifying competition for the 2013 World Men's Handball Championship, securing three vacancies for the World Championship. A decision was announced during the 2011 Pan American Games that the tournament will consist of 12 teams. As the winner of those Pan American Games, Argentina was selected as the host.

Participating teams
The participating nations have been announced on 15 May 2012.

The Dominican Republic team withdrew after the draw, reportedly for financial reasons.

Preliminary round

All times are local (UTC−3)

Group A

Group B

Placement round
Points gained in the preliminary round against teams from the same group were carried over.

Knockout stage

Bracket

Semifinals

Fifth place game

Third place game

Final

Final ranking

Best team
Goalkeeper:  Matías Schulz
Right wing:  Andrés Kogovsek
Right back:  Rodrigo Salinas
Central back:  Sebastián Simonet
Left back:  Minik Dahl Høegh
Left wing:  Felipe Borges
Pivot:  Marco Oneto

References

External links
Official website
Results on todor66.oom

2012 Pan American Men's Handball Championship
2012 in handball
2012 in Argentine sport
H
June 2012 sports events in South America